John Bernard Hynes (September 22, 1897 – January 6, 1970), was an American politician serving as the Mayor of Boston from 1950 to 1960.

Career
Hynes began his career at city hall in 1920 as a clerk in the health department. He later transferred to the auditing department and was chief clerk in the Mayor's office during James Michael Curley's 1922 to 1926 term. On January 4, 1926, Hynes became the city's assistant budget commissioner. He earned his high school and college diplomas through evening classes, graduating from Suffolk University Law School in 1927. On June 18, 1929 he was appointed assistant city clerk. In August 1943, Hynes was commissioned a Major in the United States Army. He was discharged that December due to a reoccurrence of a chronic ear issue and returned to the city clerk's office. On September 1, 1945 he became Boston's city clerk.

On June 26, 1947, Mayor James Michael Curley was sentenced to six to eighteen months in prison for mail fraud. The city charter allowed the president of the city council to serve as acting mayor in the mayor's absence, but his powers were limited unless the mayor was deceased. The Massachusetts General Court passed emergency legislation to bypass council president John B. Kelly, who had recently been acquitted on bribery charges and was in ill health, and to grant full mayoral powers to Hynes (who as city clerk was second in the line of succession) until Curley's release from prison.

Curley, upon his return from prison, commented to the press, "I have accomplished more in one day than has been done in the five months of my absence." Stung by this off-hand but disparaging comment about his performance as acting mayor, Hynes decided to challenge Curley in the November 1949 election, and defeated him.

Because of a change to the mayoral election system, the next election was held in November 1951, when Hynes again defeated Curley. Hynes faced Curley a third time in the 1955 mayoral race; Curley was eliminated in the preliminary election, and Hynes defeated John E. Powers in the general election. Overall, Hynes served as mayor from January 2, 1950, until January 4, 1960.

Hynes served as president of the United States Conference of Mayors from 1955 through 1957.

Hynes died on January 6, 1970, at Carney Hospital in Dorchester, Boston.

Legacy
During his tenure as mayor, he oversaw the opening of the Central Artery elevated highway through the city's waterfront district, as well as the opening of the Freedom Trail, which traces many of Boston's Revolutionary War era landmarks. He was responsible for founding the Boston Redevelopment Authority (BRA), which laid the foundation for developments in Boston in the 1950s and beyond including the controversial razing of the West End. Hynes and his successors, John Collins and Kevin White, are most responsible for the modernization of the city of Boston. The Hynes Convention Center, located in the Back Bay section of Boston, is named for him. One son, Jack Hynes, was a longtime Boston news anchor. His second child, Marie "Darby" Hynes Gallagher, was a special education teacher in the Boston city school system. Another son, Richard Hynes, taught at Boston University. A third son, Barry T. Hynes, served on the Boston City Council and was Boston's city clerk. Nancy, his youngest child, passed in her forties due to illness.

See also
 Timeline of Boston, 1950s

References

Further reading
 
 Beatty, Jack, The Rascal King: The Life and Times of James Michael Curley, 1874–1958, 1992.
 Krieger, Alex, David Cobb & Amy Turner, editors, Mapping Boston. Cambridge, Massachusetts: The MIT Press, 1999.

External links
 

1897 births
1970 deaths
People from Boston
American people of Irish descent
Boston city clerks
Mayors of Boston
Suffolk University Law School alumni
20th-century American politicians
Presidents of the United States Conference of Mayors